Batthulapally is a village 5 km from Kallur Mandal, and 55 km from the Khammam District of Telangana, India.

Cities and towns in Khammam district